French Sign Language (LSF) is the sign language of the deaf in France and French-speaking parts of Switzerland.  According to Ethnologue, it has 100,000 native signers.

French Sign Language is related and partially ancestral to Dutch Sign Language (NGT), Flemish Sign Language (VGT), Belgian-French Sign Language (LSFB), Irish Sign Language (ISL), American Sign Language (ASL), Quebec (also known as French Canadian) Sign Language (LSQ), Brazilian Sign Language (LSB, LGB or LSCB) and Russian Sign Language (RSL).

History 

French Sign Language is frequently, though mistakenly, attributed to the work of Charles Michel de l'Épée (l'abbé de l'Épée). In fact, he is said to have discovered the already existing language by total accident; having ducked into a nearby house to escape the rain, he fell upon a pair of deaf twin sisters and was struck by the richness and complexity of the language that they used to communicate among themselves and the deaf Parisian community. The abbé set himself to learning the language, now known as Old French Sign Language, and eventually he established a free school for the deaf. At this school, he developed a system he called "methodical signs", to teach his students how to read and write. The abbé was eventually able to make public demonstrations (1771–1774) of his system, demonstrations that attracted educators and celebrities from all over the continent and that popularised the idea that the deaf could be educated, especially by gesture.

The methodical signs he created were a mixture of sign language words he had learned with some grammatical terms he invented. The resulting combination, an artificial language, was over-complicated and completely unusable by his students. For example, where his system would elaborately construct the word "unintelligible" with a chain of five signs ("interior-understand-possible-adjective-not"), the deaf natural language would simply say "understand-impossible".  LSF was not invented by the abbé, but his major contributions to the deaf community were to recognize that the deaf did not need oral language to be able to think, and to indirectly accelerate the natural growth of the language by virtue of putting so many deaf students under a single roof.

From this time French Sign Language flourished until the late 19th century when a schism developed between the manualist and oralist schools of thought. In 1880 the Milan International Congress of Teachers for the Deaf-Mute convened and decided that the oralist tradition would be preferred. In due time the use of sign language was treated as a barrier to learning to talk and thus forbidden from the classroom.

This situation remained unchanged in France until the late 1970s, when the deaf community began to militate for greater recognition of sign language and for a bilingual education system. In 1991 the National Assembly passed the Fabius law, officially authorising the use of LSF for the education of deaf children. A law was passed in 2005 fully recognising LSF as a language in its own right.

Alphabet
The French manual alphabet is used both to distinguish signs of LSF and to incorporate French words while signing.

See also
 Old French Sign Language
 Signed French
 French Sign Language Academy
American Sign Language

References

External links
 The LSF wikibook 

 
French Sign Language family
Languages of France
Languages of Switzerland
Languages of French Guiana
Sign languages of France